Thinkhaya I of Toungoo was viceroy of Toungoo (Taungoo) from 1411/12 to 1415. Prior to the appointment at Toungoo by King Minkhaung I of Ava, Thinkhaya was governor of Sagu. He died in the fourth year in office, and was succeeded by his son Thinkhaya II. He was married to Min Shwe Pan, a granddaughter of King Swa Saw Ke of Ava and great granddaughter of King Kyawswa I of Pinya.

References

Bibliography
 
 

Ava dynasty